Color-blocking is thought of as the exploration of taking colors that are opposites on the color wheel and pairing them together to make interesting and complementary color combinations. It is commonly associated in fashion as a trend that originated from the artwork of Dutch painter, Piet Mondrian. However, other experts argue whether his artwork is the true origin of color-blocking.

History 

It's widely believed by most historians that Piet Mondrian, an artist that lived around 1900, whose paintings were a collection of stark lines and flat squares, inspired this current color-blocking trend. Mondrian valued simplicity and therefore experimented with how far he could simplify his work, maximizing simplicity while still maintaining recognizable, although abstract, geometric shapes. Mondrian later named this style of painting Neo-Plasticism. In Piet Mondrian's Neoplasticism movement, his art directly inspired the fashion world, as well as home décor and baked goods. Although Mondrian is said to be the key figure of the modern art movement, there are others that believe the credit for this trend lies with Georges Seurat and Claude Monet. However sources report that it is Piet Mondrian who inspired other designers such as Yves Saint Laurent to create the famous Mondrian Dresses. Before Mondrian's aesthetic overtook the fashion world, pop art's materialization in the 50s opened America's eyes to a more vibrant but structured world. Pop Art incorporated the same clean lines and solid colors that Piet Mondrian's work encompassed. Proponents of the Georges Seurat and Monet origin theory claim that this novel acceptance lead to the color-blocking revolution. Mondrian's Neo-Plasticism aesthetic evolved through the decades, coming to include aspects such as synthetic color and a strong imposed structure in the 1960s. The color-blocking trend took off in the 60s as fashion designers like Yves Saint Laurent adopted this revolutionary aesthetic. It wasn't long before this new trend was reaching as far as London; the youth of London began wearing ensembles that would come to be known as mod fashion. Mod fashion much resembled the artistic style of Piet Mondrian; mismatched, solid color separates that were composed of blocks in different hues.

Color-blocking resurfaced in the 2010s as a trend in domestic interior design. Although some argue that color-blocking is a thing in the past, high fashion figures and enthusiasts believe that this retro trend continues to thrive as a result of the hipster generation who revive the trend and turn it into something seen as fashion-forward.

Some elements of Native American Hopi traditional dress and ceremonial designs evoke color blocking themes. For example the traditional Kachina rituals and dolls.

Process 

In the fashion world, the process of color-blocking refers to wearing blocks of colors. Color-blocking is different from how people usually dress because the colors in the outfit are considered louder, or colors that clash. Fashion figures explain color-blocking as wearing multiple articles of solid-colored clothing in a single outfit. Traditional color-blocking consists of putting together two or three different, but complementary colors together in one outfit. It is also considered color-blocking even if the colors are not direct opposites on the color wheel. For example, yellow and orange are right next to each other, but adding purple (a color on the opposite of the wheel) creates a color-blocked outfit.

Rules 
Fashion icons, designers, and figures have developed rules that go along with the art of color-blocking. Basic rules for color-blocking are centered on the color theory. The color theory states that there are unwritten rules in color-blocking such as not wearing too many colors together at once, and balancing an outfit with a neutral such as grey.

Benefits 
Since color-blocking is an abstract form of art, it is easy to create illusions for accentuating body shapes, making people look taller and thinner. Color-blocking provides versatility to clothing that other trends and styles don't provide.

Interior design 
Color-blocking has recently spilled over into home décor and interior design. This trend takes the same idea in home design that it does in fashion: the colors are paired with no concern of matching. In the home color-blocking is used mainly in room décor and walls. Décor clashing with each other, or in more mild cases the opposite colors complement each other to provide an interesting and refreshing atmosphere in a room.

References

External links 
Color-blocking fashion
Better Homes and Gardens Color-blocking 

Fashion
Design
Artistic techniques